Leptoperla is a genus of stonefly in the family Gripopterygidae. It contains the following species:
 Leptoperla cacuminis

Plecoptera
Plecoptera genera
Taxonomy articles created by Polbot